Andrew Herman (born August 26, 1983) is a retired American professional soccer striker.

Herman graduated from Oceanside High School in 2001.  He entered American University that fall, playing three seasons of collegiate soccer with the Eagles.  In 2004, he transferred to Rutgers University for his senior season.  Herman graduated in 2005 with a bachelor's degree in criminal justice.  In 2006 Andrew played for the Virginia Beach Mariners where he made seven league appearances. In 2007 Herman played for Crystal Palace Baltimore.  In 2008, he played for the Long Island Rough Riders.

References

External links
Andrew Herman collegiate profile

1983 births
Living people
American soccer players
American Eagles men's soccer players
USL First Division players
USL Second Division players
Crystal Palace Baltimore players
Long Island Rough Riders players
Virginia Beach Mariners players
Rutgers Scarlet Knights men's soccer players
USL League Two players
People from Oceanside, New York
Association football forwards